Dhaulpur State or Dholpur State, historically known as the Kingdom of Dholpur,  was a kingdom of eastern Rajasthan, India,  which was founded in AD 1806 by a Jat ruler Rana Kirat Singh of Gohad. After 1818, the state was placed under the authority of British India's Rajputana Agency. The Ranas ruled the state until the independence of India in 1947, when the kingdom was merged with the Union of India.

The princely state of Dholpur was located in the present-day state of Rajasthan.

The former chief minister of Rajasthan, Vasundhara Raje, was a member of the erstwhile ruling family of Dholpur as she was married to Maharaja Hemant Singh before getting divorced.

History
Very little is known of the early history of the state. According to tradition a predecessor state was established as Dhavalapura. In 1505 neighboring Gohad State of Rana Jats was founded and between 1740 and 1756 Gohad occupied  Gwalior Fort. From 1761 to 1775 Dholpur was annexed to Bharatpur State and between 1782 and December 1805 Dholpur was again annexed by Gwalior. On 10 January 1806 Dholpur became a British protectorate and in the same year the Ruler of Gohad merged Gohad into Dholpur.

The last ruler of Dholpur signed the instrument of accession to the Indian Union on 7 April 1949 and the state was merged in Matsya Union.

Rulers
The rulers of the state were Jats and were styled Maharaja Rana from 1806 onwards. They were entitled to a 15-gun salute.

Rulers of Gohad (title Rana) 
1699 – 1713: Gaj Singh (d. 1713) 
1713 – 1717: Jaswant Singh (d. 1717) 
1717 – 1756: Bhim Singh Rana (d. 1756)
1756 – 1757: Girdhar Pratap Singh (d. 1757) 
1757 – 1784: Chhatar Singh (d. 1788)  (personal style Maharaj Rana from 1771)
1784 – 1804: Interregnum
1804 – 1806: Kirat Singh (b. 1763 – d. 1836)

Rulers of Dholpur (title Maharaja Rana) 
1806 – 21 April 1836: Kirat Singh (s.a.) 
1836 – Dec 1836: Pohap Singh (d. 1836)
Dec 1836 – 7 February 1873: Bhagwant Singh (b. 1824 – d. 1873) (from 2 June 1869, Sir Bhagwant Singh)
7 Feb 1873 – 20 July 1901: Nihal Singh (b. 1863 – d. 1901) 
7 Feb 1873 – 1884: Maharani Sateha Devi (b. 1845 – d. 1888) Bhawa (f) – Regent
20 Jul 1901 – 29 March 1911: Ram Singh (b. 1883 – d. 1911) (from 1 January 1909, Sir Ram Singh)
20 Jul 1901 – Mar 1905: .... – Regent
29 Mar 1911 – 15 August 1947: Udai Bhan Singh (b. 1893 – d. 1954) (from 1 January 1918, Sir Udai Bhan Singh)
29 Mar 1911 – 9 October 1913: .... – Regent

The descendants of Maharaj Udai Bhan Singh and Maharaj Nihal Singh are still carrying on their family legacy.

 Yuvaraja Dushyant Singh S/o Maharaj Hemant Singh and Vasundhra Raje Scindia, he is the next Maharaj Rana of Dholpur
 Veer Virender Singh S/o Maharaj Nihal Singh
 Keshav Singh Rana S/o Maharaj Nihal Singh married Kunwarani Kartar Kaur
 
 Kunwar Vikram Rana S/o Rana Upender Singh married Kunwarani Harman Garcha

Kunwar Vikram Rana is the youngest member of the erstwhile ruling family, great-grandson of Maharaj Nihal Singh.

See also
Gohad State—For early history of Dholpur rulers

References

External links 
 
 Genealogy of the rulers of Dholpur
 Princely States of India  A-J

Princely states of Rajasthan
Jat princely states

Rajputana Agency
States and territories established in the 700s
States and territories established in 1806
States and territories disestablished in 1949
1st-century establishments in India
1806 establishments in British India
1949 disestablishments in India